Amelia Alicia Anscelly (born 26 April 1988) is a Malaysian badminton player who specializes in doubles. In 2015, she won the Grand Prix Gold title at the Syed Modi International tournament in the women's doubles event partnered with Soong Fie Cho. She and Soong also won the gold medal at the 2015 Southeast Asian Games.

Achievements

Southeast Asian Games 
Women's doubles

BWF Grand Prix 
The BWF Grand Prix had two levels, the Grand Prix and Grand Prix Gold. It was a series of badminton tournaments sanctioned by the Badminton World Federation (BWF) and played between 2007 and 2017.

Women's doubles

  BWF Grand Prix Gold tournament
  BWF Grand Prix tournament

BWF International Challenge/Series 
Women's doubles

Mixed doubles

  BWF International Challenge tournament
  BWF International Series tournament

References

External links 
 
 

1988 births
Living people
Malaysian female badminton players
People from Kota Kinabalu
People from Sabah
Badminton players at the 2014 Asian Games
Asian Games competitors for Malaysia
Competitors at the 2007 Southeast Asian Games
Competitors at the 2015 Southeast Asian Games
Southeast Asian Games gold medalists for Malaysia
Southeast Asian Games silver medalists for Malaysia
Southeast Asian Games bronze medalists for Malaysia
Southeast Asian Games medalists in badminton
21st-century Malaysian women